Perry Municipal Airport  is a city-owned public-use airport located three nautical miles (6 km) west of the central business district of Perry, a city in Dallas County, Iowa, United States. This airport is included in the FAA's National Plan of Integrated Airport Systems for 2015–2019, which categorized it as a general aviation facility.

Facilities and aircraft 
It has two runways: 14/32 is 4,001 by 75 feet (1,220 x 23 m) with a concrete surface and 4/22 is 2,322 by 237 feet (708 x 72 m) with a turf surface.

For the 12-month period ending July 16, 2007, the airport had 4,750 aircraft operations, an average of 13 per day: 98% general aviation and 2% military. At that time there were 19 aircraft based at this airport: 95% single-engine and 5% jet.

References

External links 
 

Airports in Iowa
Transportation buildings and structures in Dallas County, Iowa
Perry, Iowa